Ryan Matthew Hendrix (born December 16, 1994) is an American professional baseball pitcher in the Arizona Diamondbacks organization. He made his MLB debut in 2021 for the Cincinnati Reds.

Career

Amateur career
Hendrix attended Cypress Woods High School in Cypress, Texas. He was drafted by the Cleveland Indians in the 17th round of the 2013 MLB draft, but did not sign and attended Texas A&M University. In 2015, Hendrix played for the United States collegiate national team. Against Cuba, Hendrix, Tanner Houck, and A. J. Puk combined to throw a no-hitter. Hendrix was drafted by the Cincinnati Reds in the 5th round, with the 138th overall selection, of the 2016 MLB draft, and signed with them.

Professional career

Cincinnati Reds
Hendrix split his professional debut season of 2016 between the Billings Mustangs and the Dayton Dragons, going a combined 3–1 with a 3.57 ERA and 36 strikeouts over  innings. He split the 2017 season between Dayton and the Daytona Tortugas, going a combined 5–5 with a 2.90 ERA and 88 strikeouts over 62 innings. He spent the 2018 season with Daytona, going 4–4 with a 1.76 ERA and 79 strikeouts over 51 innings. He split the 2019 season between the Arizona League Reds and the Chattanooga Lookouts, going a combined 4–0 with a 1.85 ERA and 31 strikeouts over  innings.

Hendrix was added to the Reds 40–man roster after the 2019 season. He did not play a minor league game in 2020 due to the cancellation of the minor league season caused by the COVID-19 pandemic.

On April 23, 2021, Hendrix was promoted to the major leagues for the first time. He made his MLB debut that day, pitching a shutout inning of relief against the St. Louis Cardinals. In the game, he also recorded his first two major league strikeouts, punching out Justin Williams and Tommy Edman.

On April 24, 2022, Hendrix was designated for assignment by the Reds. He cleared waivers and was sent outright to Triple-A Louisville on April 29.

He had his contract selected again on July 16. He was returned to the minors on July 19. He had his contract selected on July 30, 2022.

On October 20, 2022, Hendrix elected to become a free agent.

Arizona Diamondbacks
On December 9, 2022, Hendrix signed a minor league contract with the Arizona Diamondbacks.

References

External links

Texas A&M Aggies bio

1994 births
Living people
Arizona League Reds players
Baseball players from Texas
Billings Mustangs players
Cincinnati Reds players
Dayton Dragons players
Daytona Tortugas players
Chattanooga Lookouts players
Major League Baseball pitchers
People from Lufkin, Texas
Texas A&M Aggies baseball players
Mat-Su Miners players